Sarocladium oryzae (Sawada) is a plant pathogen causing the sheath rot disease of rice and bamboo blight in Asia.

Taxonomy and morphology

Sarocladium oryzae has irregularly penicillate conidiophores and slimy, 1-celled conidia.

Sarocladium oryzae was previously known as Acrocylindrium oryzae.  For forty years prior to 2005, the industrial  strain used to manufacture the antibiotic cerulenin was known under the invalidly published name "Cephalosporium caerulens", but a subculture of the original C. caerulens strain KF-140 was subsequently shown to be conspecific with S. oryzae.

Physiology and metabolites 
In axenic culture, S. oryzae produces 0.3–0.627 micrograms of helvolic acid and 0.9–4.8 micrograms of cerulenin per milliliter of culture medium.  The level of helvolic acid correlated with a higher incidence of sheath rot disease. Rice grains from infected plants were found to contain 2.2 micrograms helvolic acid and 1.75 micrograms of cerulein per gram of infected seeds, which induce chlorosis and reduce the seed viability and seedling health.

Plant disease symptoms
The disease is found in rice plants usually injured by insects or other diseases. Hot and humid (wet) weather favour the disease. It is also associated with virus-infected plants. Early symptoms are oblong to irregular spots, with gray centers and brown margins. Spots or rotting occur on the leaf sheath that encloses the young panicles. There is discoloration in the sheath. In severe infection, all or part of the young panicles do not emerge and remain within the sheath. Unemerged panicles will soon rot and produce powdery fungus growth inside the leaf sheath.

Infection occurs on the uppermost leaf sheath at all stages, but is most damaging when it occurs at late booting stage.

Management 
They also recommend application of fertilisers including potassium, calcium sulphate and zinc sulphate during the tillering stage to strengthen the stem and leaf tissues.

The Bureau of Rice Research and Development, Rice Department, of Thailand recommends using disease-free seeds and plants, avoiding monocropping with any one variety of rice (planting at least two varieties in the same field), and regular monitoring of fields.

Sources

References

External links 

USDA ARS Fungal Database
 Rice Diseases in Mississippi: A Guide to Identification] (includes photo of sheath rot)

Fungal plant pathogens and diseases
Rice diseases
Ascomycota enigmatic taxa